Sugenheim is a municipality  in the district of Neustadt (Aisch)-Bad Windsheim in Bavaria, Germany.
The municipality consists of eleven villages:

Gallery

References

Neustadt (Aisch)-Bad Windsheim